| tries            = {{#expr:
 +11 + 2 + 2 + 1 + 0 + 5 + 3 + 3
 + 1 + 4 + 3 + 1 + 0 + 5 + 1 + 1
 + 4 + 6 + 2 + 6 + 6 + 3 + 5 + 5
 + 5 + 2 + 5 + 3 + 4 + 6 + 3 + 6
 + 7 + 1 + 0 + 3 + 3 + 2 + 5 + 1
 + 2 + 4 + 1 + 2 + 3 + 6 + 5 + 0
 + 5 + 1 + 3 + 2 + 2 + 2 + 4 + 3
 + 2 + 1 + 3 + 5 + 6 + 1 + 2 + 1
 + 6 + 1 + 4 + 2 + 5 + 2 + 2 + 2
+ 3 + 2 + 1 + 5 + 3 + 2 + 1 + 6
+ 4 + 4 + 7 + 4 + 4 + 4 + 4 + 4
+ 4 + 1 + 3 + 3 + 5 + 6 + 0 + 1
+ 3 + 1 + 2 + 2 + 4 + 8 + 6 + 5
+ 3 + 2 + 1 + 0 + 2 + 5 + 0 + 0
+ 5 + 6 + 6 + 0 + 5 + 4 + 2 + 4
+ 7 + 0 + 4 + 2 + 2 + 3 + 6 + 3
+ 1 + 3 + 1 + 7 + 4 + 0 + 1 + 4
+ 4 + 5 + 1 + 1 + 0 + 8 + 2 + 1
+ 4 + 0 + 6 + 0 + 1 + 2 + 1 + 2
+ 2 + 2 + 0 + 4 + 4 + 9 + 5 + 3
+ 9 + 4 + 1 + 7 + 6 + 4 + 6
+ 1 + 3 + 7 + 5 + 2 +12 + 6 + 4
+ 4 + 5 + 5 + 3 +10 + 1 + 2 + 9
+ 6 + 5 + 3 + 5 + 7 + 5 + 5 + 1
+ 1 + 2 + 4 + 7 + 9 + 3 + 4 + 5
+ 7 + 3 + 5 + 6 +10 + 3 + 6 + 7
+ 3 + 3 + 3 + 2 + 4 + 5 + 2 + 5
+ 6 + 1 + 3 + 7 + 1 + 5 + 5 + 7
+ 1 + 3 + 7 + 2 + 4 + 8 + 1 + 3
+ 5
+ 7 + 6 + 7 + 4 +11 + 0 + 6 + 6
+ 2 + 6 + 6
}}
| top point scorer = 376 points
| top try scorer   = Mosese Ratuvou (Lyon)19 tries
| website          = www.lnr.fr
| prevseason       = 2012–13
| nextseason       = 2014–15
}}
The 2013–14 Rugby Pro D2 is the second-level French rugby union club competition, behind the Top 14, for the 2013–14 season. It ran alongside the 2013–14 Top 14 competition; both competitions are operated by the Ligue Nationale de Rugby (LNR).

Teams

Changes in the lineup from 2012–13 were:
 Oyonnax won the 2012–13 Pro D2 title and were thereby automatically promoted to the Top 14. Brive won the promotion playoffs to secure the second promotion place.
 The bottom two finishers in 2012–13, Massy and Pays d'Aix, were relegated from Pro D2 to Fédérale 1. 
 The two bottom finishers in the 2012–13 Top 14 season, Agen and Mont-de-Marsan, were relegated to Pro D2.
 The two finalists in Fédérale 1, champion Bourg-en-Bresse and runner-up Bourgoin, earned promotion.  Bourgoin had been forcibly relegated to Fédérale 1 for financial reasons at the end of the 2011–12 season and initially there was doubt about whether they would be promoted back to Pro D2 (which would have reprieved Pays d'Aix).  On 27 June 2013, LNR's financial watchdog, the DNACG (Direction nationale d’aide et de contrôle de gestion) permitted the promotion.

Competition format
The top team at the end of the regular season (after all the teams played one another twice, once at home, once away), is declared champion and earns a spot in the next Top 14 season. Teams ranked second to fifth compete in promotion playoffs, with the semifinals being played at the home ground of the higher-ranked team. The final is then played on neutral ground, and the winner earns the second ticket to the next Top 14.

The LNR uses a slightly different bonus points system from that used in most other rugby competitions. It trialled a new system in 2007–08 explicitly designed to prevent a losing team from earning more than one bonus point in a match, a system that also made it impossible for either team to earn a bonus point in a drawn match. LNR chose to continue with this system for subsequent seasons.

France's bonus point system operates as follows:

 4 points for a win.
 2 points for a draw.
 1 bonus point for winning while scoring at least 3 more tries than the opponent. This replaces the standard bonus point for scoring 4 tries regardless of the match result.
 1 bonus point for losing by 7 points (or less).

Table

Relegation
Normally, the teams that finish in 15th and 16th places in the table are relegated to Fédérale 1 at the end of the season.  In certain circumstances, "financial reasons" may cause a higher placed team to be demoted instead.  This last happened at the end of the 2011–12 season when 9th place Bourgoin were relegated thereby reprieving 15th place Béziers.

Fixtures
After the General Assembly of the League National de Rugby, held at Aix-en-Provence on 5 and 6 July 2013, the outline calendar of fixtures for the 2013–14 season were released.  Detailed fixtures information evolves as the season progresses (i.e. specific kick off times).  Match attendances are from the official web site (Affluences).

Round 1

Round 2

Round 3

Round 4

Round 5

Round 6

Round 7

Round 8

Round 9

Round 10

Round 11

Round 12

Round 13

Round 14

Round 15

Round 16

Round 17

Round 18

Round 19

Round 20

Round 21

 This match originally finished with a 33 – 35 victory to La Rochelle with a successful penalty kick on the siren (that is, the stadium siren marking the end of 80 minutes).  Carcassonne argued that the ball had been off the field after the siren – and before Fortassin kicked the winning penalty – and therefore the game was over at this point.  The LNR agreed with them and decided Carcassonne had won the match 33 – 32.  La Rochelle, in their turn, appealed against this decision and as a result, the FFR ordered the match to be replayed.  La Rochelle has accepted this but Carcassonne have decided to appeal to the CNOSF.
The LNR has ordered this game to be replayed on 7 May.  The game was ordered to go ahead at 7pm despite CNOSF's opinion that the win should be awarded to Carcassonne.

Round 22

Round 23

Round 24

Round 25

 Despite this result, Lyon will finish in the top five at the end of the season, guaranteeing at least a playoff place.

Round 26

Round 27

Round 28

 With this result, Lyon clinches the championship, promotion to the 2014–15 Top 14, and a place in the 2014–15 European Rugby Challenge Cup.

Round 29

Round 21 replay

Round 30

Play–offs
The highest ranked team at the end of the regular season – Lyon – won automatic promotion to the Top 14 as champion de France de PRO D2 2014.

Semi–finals
The semi–finals follow a 2 v 5, 3 v 4 system, with the higher ranked team playing at home.

Final
The winners of the semi–finals played off for the second promotion spot to the Top 14.

 La Rochelle are promoted to the Top 14 for 2014–15, and also earn a spot in the 2014–15 European Rugby Challenge Cup.

See also
2013–14 Top 14 season
List of 2013-2014 Top 14 transfers

References

External links
  Ligue Nationale de Rugby – Official website
  Midi Olympique

2013-14
Pro D2